Dina Martina is a drag performer who has also been described as a comedian, dancer, performance artist, and singer. Dina Martina's shows have included Chariots of Failure, Fine Avec Me, and an annual Christmas production sometimes called Dina Martina Christmas Show. Dina Martina "splits time" between Seattle and Provincetown, Massachusetts, as of 2020.

References

External links
 

Living people
American comedians
American dancers
Drag performers
American performance artists
People from Provincetown, Massachusetts
People from Seattle
Year of birth missing (living people)
Comedians from Massachusetts
Comedians from Washington (state)